Édouard Axelrad (10 June 1918 – 2006) was a French writer.

Biography 
Axelrad was born in Paris in June 1918. During the Holocaust, Axelrad was detained at Auschwitz because of his Jewish heritage. Due to his talent as painter, a Nazi official spared his life. Axelrad was held at the Sachsenhausen concentration camp until the end of World War II, as he detailed in his 1988 book Le Jaune. Axelrad died in 2006.

Works 
 L'Arche ensevelie, 1959 
 La Terre de la gazelle
 Marie Casse-croûte, 1985, Prix RTL grand public 1985
 Le Jaune, 1988 
 La cavale irlandaise, 1991
 Au Fil du fleuve, 1994

Notes 

1918 births
2006 deaths
Auschwitz concentration camp survivors
French Resistance members
Writers from Paris